Shanghai Golden Eagles (上海金鹰) is a baseball team based in Shanghai and a member of the China Baseball League. The home field for the big games is the 40,000-capacity Jiangwan Sports Centre in Shanghai.

Roster
Pitchers
Jun Zhang
Zhang Li
Infielders
Qi Chen, 1B
Yufeng Zhang, SS
James Kang, DH All Star from Virginia

References

Baseball in China
Sports teams in Shanghai